Puerto Rico Surf SC is a Puerto Rican association football club that currently plays in the Liga Puerto Rico. It operates in the municipalities of Guaynabo, Dorado, and Aguadilla.

History
On June 20, 2020 Puerto Rico Surf SC was announced as the newest of over thirty affiliates under the San Diego Surf and Surf Soccer umbrella.

Domestic history
Key

References

External links
Official Facebook profile

Football clubs in Puerto Rico
Association football clubs established in 2020